"You Just Watch Me" is a song written by Bob Regan and Rick Giles. It was originally recorded by Libby Hurley for Epic Records in 1987. Her version went to number 43 on Hot Country Songs.

The song was later recorded by American country music artist Tanya Tucker.  It was released in September 1994 as the fourth single from the album Soon.  The song reached number 20 on the same chart.

Chart performance

References

1994 singles
1987 songs
Tanya Tucker songs
Songs written by Bob Regan
Liberty Records singles
Songs written by Rick Giles
Song recordings produced by Jerry Crutchfield